Henry Beauchamp may refer to:

 Henry Pottinger Stephens (1851–1903), known as Henry Beauchamp, English dramatist and journalist
Henry Beauchamp, 1st Duke of Warwick (1425–1445), English nobleman

See also